"Young Guns (Go for It)" (also listed as "Young Guns (Go for It!)" on some releases) is a song by English pop duo Wham! first released as a single in the UK by Innervision Records in October 1982. It was written and co-produced by George Michael, of the duo.
The song was Wham!'s first hit, achieved with help from the BBC music programme Top of the Pops, which invited Wham! on to the show as a last-minute replacement for another act which had pulled out. The producer of Top of the Pops Michael Hurll, had seen them on another programme, Saturday Superstore.

Composition
George Michael wrote the song about a teenage boy's worry that his best friend was getting too committed to a girl when he should have been enjoying his youth and the single life. It featured a middle eight aside in which the girl conversely tried to get her boyfriend to ditch the best friend, prompting a vocal battle, akin to a tug of war, between the girlfriend and the best friend, which prompted the 'go for it' aspect of the song, as featured in the title.

Top of the Pops
Wham! were just outside the top 40 threshold of the UK Singles Chart at the time, which meant they had not climbed high enough in normal circumstances to get on the show, but they were recruited nonetheless as the highest-placed artists still climbing the charts from outside the top 40.
On Top of the Pops, Michael mimed the vocals to his Wham! partner Andrew Ridgeley, who acted the part of the teenage bridegroom-in-waiting. They were flanked by backing singers Dee C Lee and Shirlie Holliman.

The original recording does not feature the voices of Lee or Holliman but that of American backing singer Lynda Hayes.

Chart performance
The song entered the chart initially at number 73, went up to number 48, then dropped to number 52 and the week after that, it jumped to number 42. Their appearance on Top of the Pops broke the record wide open and on the following Monday the distribution centre received some thirty thousand orders. This sent the record to number 24 before eventually peaking at number 3 in November 1982.

Track listing

 "Going for It" is an instrumental version of "Young Guns (Go for It)"

Charts and certifications

Weekly charts

Year-end charts

Certifications

References

1982 songs
1982 singles
Wham! songs
Number-one singles in Sweden
Songs written by George Michael
Song recordings produced by George Michael
CBS Records singles
Innervision Records singles
Alcazar (band) songs
2015 singles